Rider of Mystery Ranch is a 1924 American silent film directed by Denver Dixon, and starring Art Mix. It premiered on May 3, 1924, in Chillicothe, Missouri.

Production
In early April 1924 it was announced that Los Angeles distributor R.D. Lewis had acquired the distribution rights to the film, after he moved there from Oklahoma City.  It was part of a six-picture deal of Art Mix films, which included Ace of Cactus Range and South of Santa Fe.

References

1924 films
American silent films
American black-and-white films
Films directed by Victor Adamson